Fernando Carmona may refer to:

 Fernando Ocaranza Carmona (1876–1965), Mexican surgeon
 Fernando Briones Carmona (1905–1988), Spanish painter